Silvo Habat is a Slovenian former professional Grand Prix motorcycle road racer.

Between 1984 and 1986, Habat won three 250cc national championships in the former Yugoslavia and, became the first Yugoslavian rider to win the highest award of the Yugoslavia in the 250cc class - "Gold helmet". In 1987, he became the only Slovenian or ex-Yugoslavian rider to compete in the 500cc world championships. Motor was bought by the Dutch competitor Boet van Dulmen. His best result was a 14th place in the World Championship race at Le Mans. That year he performed well in the European Championships in Donnington and finished 11th place. In 1988, he bought a brand new Honda RS500, and raced in world and European Championships. At the Grand Prix of Yugoslavia in Grobnik, Silvo Habat put Yugoslavian race track record, which amounted to 1.36.0 min. In the race for the European Championship in Misano, he finished in 6th place. In August 1988, he participated in an international race in Schleiz (DDR), where he defeated almost all the competition for more than one lap and set an absolute race track record. His name is still engraved on the memorial stone that stands in the middle of the city Schleiz. In 1988, Silvo Habat retired from competition but, came out of retirement in 1991 when he bought an old Yamaha 250cc and began again to compete in the Slovenian national championships and international championships. He again conquered the highest places, and was twice vice-champion of Slovenia. He also had top three finishes in races in Austria, the Czech Republic and Germany. In 1993, he bought a Kawasaki ZXR750 and raced for two seasons in the Slovenian Superbike championship, finishing in second place in both seasons. Habat retired for good after the 1994 season.

References

Wikipedia internal links
 1988 Czechoslovakian motorcycle Grand Prix
 1988 Yugoslavian motorcycle Grand Prix
 List of Grand Prix motorcycle racers: H

Slovenian motorcycle racers
500cc World Championship riders
20th-century births
Possibly living people
Year of birth missing (living people)
People from the Municipality of Trzin